The Water Witch Steam Fire Engine Company No. 5 is a historic fire station at 1814 Gilpin Avenue in Wilmington, Delaware.  The -story brick building was designed by Edward L. Rice, Jr., a leading Wilmington architect, and built in 1893.  The building is an architecturally eclectic mix of Queen Anne and Second Empire styling, and has retained many of its original interior details.

The building was listed on the National Register of Historic Places in 2011.

See also
 National Register of Historic Places listings in Wilmington, Delaware

References

Fire stations completed in 1893
Fire stations on the National Register of Historic Places in Delaware
National Register of Historic Places in Wilmington, Delaware
1893 establishments in Delaware
Queen Anne architecture in Delaware
Second Empire architecture in Delaware